Aipysurus is a genus of venomous snakes in the subfamily Hydrophiinae of the family Elapidae. Member species of the genus are found in warm seas from the Indian Ocean to the Pacific Ocean.

Taxonomy
The first description of the genus Aipysurus was published by Bernard Germain de Lacépède in 1804, accommodating his description of a new species found in Australian seas, Aipysurus laevis, the type species of the genus. The description was accompanied by an illustration of the new species.
The genus is one of a small group of the viviparous sea snakes (Hydrophiinae: Hydrophiini) with Emydocephalus, also mostly restricted to the seas between Timor, New Guinea and northern Australia.

The following is a list of species.

Nota bene: A binomial authority in parentheses indicates that the species was originally described in a genus other than Aipysurus.

A subspecies nominated in 1974 as A. laevis pooleorum was elevated in 1983 to full species status, as A. pooleorum, without explanation by the authors. The same revision (Wells and  Wellington, 1983) also resurrected the species name Aipysurus jukesii (Gray, 1846), recognised as a synonym of Lacépède's Aipysurus laevis.

Notes

References

Further reading
Boulenger, George Albert (1896). Catalogue of the Snakes in the British Museum (Natural History). Volume III., Containing the Colubridæ (Opisthoglyphæ and Proteroglyphæ) ... London: Trustees of the British Museum (Natural History). (Taylor and Francis, printers). xiv + 727 pp. + Plates I-XXV. (Genus Aipysurus, p. 303).
Goin, Coleman J.; Goin, Olive B.; Zug, George R. (1978). Introduction to Herpetology, Third Edition. San Francisco: W.H. Freeman and Company. xi + 378 pp. . (Aipysurus, p. 332).

External links

 
Snake genera
Taxa named by Bernard Germain de Lacépède